Broad Green could refer to:

Broad Green, Cambridgeshire 
Broad Green, Essex
Broad Green, Herefordshire
Broad Green, London
Broad Green (ward)
Broad Green, Merseyside 
Broad Green, Mid Suffolk
Broad Green, St Edmundsbury